Remington Glacier  is a steep glacier about  long in Doyran Heights in the Sentinel Range of Ellsworth Mountains, Antarctica.  It rises just north of McPherson Peak and flows east-southeast to debouch between the terminus of Hough Glacier and Johnson Spur.

Background

Discovered by U.S. Navy Squadron VX-6 on photographic flights of December 14–15, 1959, and mapped by United States Geological Survey (USGS) from these photos.

Named by Advisory Committee on Antarctic Names (US-ACAN) for Edward W. Remington, glaciologist at the South Pole Station during the IGY in 1957.

See also
 List of glaciers in the Antarctic
 Glaciology

Maps
 Vinson Massif.  Scale 1:250 000 topographic map.  Reston, Virginia: US Geological Survey, 1988.
Antarctic Digital Database (ADD). Scale 1:250000 topographic map of Antarctica. Scientific Committee on Antarctic Research (SCAR). Since 1993, regularly upgraded and updated.

References

 

Glaciers of Ellsworth Land